Peutz is a Dutch surname. Notable people with the surname include:

Jan Peutz (1886–1957), Dutch internist
Frits Peutz (1896–1974), Dutch architect

See also
 Petz (disambiguation)
 Peutz–Jeghers syndrome

Dutch-language surnames